Keylla Ivonne Hernández Ramos (May 10, 1973, Mayagüez, Puerto Rico – December 31, 2018, San Juan, Puerto Rico), better known as Keylla Hernández, was a Puerto Rican television reporter. She worked for WAPA-TV. She was the co-anchor of the station's morning news show, Noticentro al Amanecer.

Personal 
Hernández had a husband, Robin, and two sons.

She graduated in journalism from the Universidad del Sagrado Corazón in 1995.

During her cancer battle, Hernández befriended Puerto Rican Independence Party's politician and governor candidate Juan Dalmau and his family; one of Dalmau's sons also had cancer.

Acting
Hernandez participated, during 2017, in a theatrical play named "Titantos", alongside Marilyn Pupo, among others.

Disease
During 2015, Hernández went to a doctor's checkup following a chest injury; x-rays and further testing revealed she had lung cancer. Hernández made a public announcement concerning her diagnosis during a live broadcast.

At first she showed some improvements and she briefly returned to co-anchor Noticentro al Amanecer, but was re-diagnosed during the summer of 2018, this time with liver cancer. She flew to Tampa, Florida, for monthly treatments and further testing at the H. Lee Moffitt Cancer Center & Research Institute.

Death
Hernandez died at a Puerto Rican hospital on December 31, 2018, surrounded by her family. Hernández's funeral was partly held at the Palacio de Recreación y Deportes coliseum in her native Mayagüez, Puerto Rico. Her funeral was broadcast live to Puerto Rico and the United States. Her ashes were scattered in Puerto Rico.

In addition, many people came from across Puerto Rico to see her for the last time at her Mayagüez wake.

Legacy
Governor Ricardo Rosselló expressed that "(he was) lamenting the sad news of the passing of Keylla Hernández. Her battle against cancer was an example of tenacity that inspired many in a similar situation. (Rosselló's wife) Beatriz and I send a solidarity hug to her family, her co-workers at @WapaTV, and her friends".

San Juan mayor, Carmen Yulín Cruz. meanwhile, declared that the city's flags would fly at half-mast.

See also

 List of Puerto Ricans

References

1973 births
2018 deaths
Deaths from cancer in Puerto Rico
Deaths from liver cancer
People from Mayagüez, Puerto Rico
Puerto Rican television journalists
Puerto Rican Catholics
Puerto Rican actresses
Universidad del Sagrado Corazón alumni